The 2020 Prague Open (branded as the 2020 J&T Banka Prague Open for sponsorship reasons) was a professional women's tennis tournament that was played on outdoor clay courts at the TK Sparta Praha in Prague, Czech Republic. It was a WTA International-class tournament on the 2020 WTA Tour.

The tournament was played from 10 to 16 August 2020, delayed from its usual late-April scheduling due to the COVID-19 pandemic. The tournament was held simultaneously with a second, U.S.-based event, the Top Seed Open in Kentucky, in order to provide additional options for players leading into the 2020 Western & Southern Open in New York City.

Points and prize money

Point distribution

Prize money 

*per team

Singles main draw entrants

Seeds 

 Rankings are as of March 16, 2020

Other entrants 
The following players received wildcards into the singles main draw:
  Eugenie Bouchard
  Linda Fruhvirtová 
  Barbora Krejčíková

The following players received entry from the qualifying draw:
  Marta Kostyuk
  Elena-Gabriela Ruse
  Mayar Sherif
  Lesia Tsurenko

The following players received entry as a lucky loser: 
  Magdalena Fręch
  Leonie Küng
  Storm Sanders

Withdrawals 
Before the tournament
  Belinda Bencic → replaced by  Camila Giorgi
  Fiona Ferro → replaced by  Leonie Küng
  Anett Kontaveit → replaced by  Laura Siegemund
  Kristina Mladenovic → replaced by  Tamara Zidanšek
  Karolína Muchová → replaced by  Ana Bogdan
  Jeļena Ostapenko → replaced by  Jasmine Paolini
  Elena Rybakina → replaced by  Sara Sorribes Tormo
  Maria Sakkari → replaced by  Arantxa Rus
  Iga Świątek → replaced by  Storm Sanders
  Alison Van Uytvanck → replaced by  Kristýna Plíšková
  Donna Vekić → replaced by  Patricia Maria Țig
  Markéta Vondroušová → replaced by  Irina-Camelia Begu
  Dayana Yastremska → replaced by  Magdalena Fręch
During the tournament
  Lesia Tsurenko

Doubles main draw entrants

Seeds 

 1 Rankings are as of March 16, 2020

Other entrants 
The following pairs received wildcards into the doubles main draw:
  Linda Fruhvirtová /  Darja Viďmanová
  Miriam Kolodziejová /  Jesika Malečková

Withdrawals 
During the tournament
  Patricia Maria Țig

Finals

Singles 

  Simona Halep defeated  Elise Mertens, 6–2, 7–5

Doubles 

  Lucie Hradecká /  Kristýna Plíšková defeated  Monica Niculescu /  Raluca Olaru, 6–2, 6–2

References

External links 
 Official website

Prague Open

 
JandT Banka
2020
Prague Open
Prague